The following is a list of Sri Lankan academics.



A
 Nicholas Attygalle
 Sarath Amunugama
 Arisen Ahubudu
 Lalith Athulathmudali
 Arthur C. Clarke

B
 Seneka Bibile
 Osmund Bopearachchi

C
 Cyril Ponnamperuma
 Muhammad Monty Cassim
 Asantha Cooray

D
 William de Alwis
 Malathi de Alwis
 David de Kretser
 Nalin de Silva
 Mahinda Deegalle
 Colvin R. de Silva
 Paules Edward Pieris Deraniyagala
 Chandre Dharma-wardana
 J B Disanayake
 Siran Upendra Deraniyagala

E
 Hema Ellawala

F
 Devaka Fernando

G
 Lalith Gamage
 Brendon Gooneratne
 Savitri Goonesekere
 Sarath Gunapala
 Ananda W.P. Guruge

H
 George Morrison Reid Henry

I
 Abhaya Induruwa

J
 Osmund Jayaratne
 C. L. V. Jayathilake
 K. N. Jayatilleke
 Kumari Jayawardena
 Amal Jayawardane
 Lal Jayawardane

K
 Kusuma Karunaratne
 Sam Karunaratne
 Karunasena Kodituwakku
 Kollupitiye Mahinda Sangharakkhitha Thera
 Sarath Kotagama
 S.R. Kottegoda
 Edward Frederick Kelaart
 W. S. Karunaratne

M
 Sunanda Mahendra
 Gunapala Piyasena Malalasekera
 Patrick Mendis
 Susirith Mendis
 Mohan Munasinghe

N
 T. Nadaraja

O
 Gananath Obeyesekere

P
 Senarath Paranavithana
 Ajith C. S. Perera
 E.O.E. Pereira
 G. L. Peiris
 Malik Peiris
 N. M. Perera

R
 Walpola Rahula
 Suri Ratnapala
 Kavan Ratnatunga

S
 V. K. Samaranayake
 Ediriweera Sarachchandra
 Regi Siriwardena
 Visvanatha Sastriyar
 Priyani Soysa

U
 Deepika Udagama
 Jayadeva Uyangoda

V
 T. Varagunam

W
 Frank Wall
 Deepal Warakagoda
 Wickrema Weerasooria
 Tilak Weerasooriya
 Chandra Wickramasinghe
 Maitree Wickramasinghe
 Nira Wickramasinghe
 Anton Wicky
 M.J.S.Wijeratne
 Rajiva Wijesinha

Z
 A. P. de Zoysa

See also

References

Sri Lankan academics
Academics
Sri Lanka
Academia in Sri Lanka
Academics
Academics